Skylloura (or Şillura) is a village located in the Nicosia District of Cyprus, about halfway between the towns of Morphou and Nicosia. It is administered by the Lefkoşa District of Northern Cyprus. In the town the two main roads Morphou-Nicosia and Kyrenia-Lapithos-Skylloura meet.

It was a mixed village with a Greek Cypriot majority before the intercommunal violence of 1963-64. A number of Turkish Cypriots were abducted from the village and killed by Greek Cypriot militia, which led to the Turkish Cypriot inhabitants fleeing to Turkish Cypriot villages and Nicosia. In the 1974 Turkish invasion of Cyprus, the Greek Cypriot inhabitants fled in the wake of the Turkish military advance. The village is currently mainly inhabited by its original Turkish Cypriot inhabitants, however, there is a military camp in the village, and a large segment of the population consists of the family of military personnel.

References

Communities in Nicosia District
Populated places in Lefkoşa District